"Blurred" is a single released by dance music artist Pianoman on 3 June 1996.

The song is a mix of mid-'90s dance production (such as a prominent synthesizer riff running throughout the song), a sample of the chorus from the Blur song "Girls & Boys", and a piano melody from Jimi Polo's "Better Days", that comes in whenever the Blur sample does. It was a big hit in Ibiza in 1995 before being officially released the next year.

The song reached number 6 on the UK Singles Chart, after Blur approved the sample (Blur initially disliked the use of the sample, until they saw the success the track had attained in clubs across Europe). It remains Pianoman's only hit single.

Charts

Weekly charts

Year-end charts

References

1996 singles
1995 songs
Songs written by Damon Albarn
Songs written by Graham Coxon
Songs written by Alex James (musician)